Gustav Gotthardt Tiefenthaler (July 25, 1886 – April 14, 1942) was a Swiss-American wrestler who competed in the 1904 Summer Olympics. In 1904, he won a bronze medal in light flyweight category. He was born in Switzerland and died in St. Louis, Missouri.

References

External links
profile

1886 births
1942 deaths
Wrestlers at the 1904 Summer Olympics
American male sport wrestlers
Olympic bronze medalists for the United States in wrestling
Medalists at the 1904 Summer Olympics
Swiss emigrants to the United States